The West Texas A&M Buffaloes football program is the intercollegiate American football team for the West Texas A&M University located in the U.S. state of Texas. The team competes in Division II and are members of the Lone Star Conference. The school's first football team was fielded in 1910. Since 2019, the Buffaloes have played their home games at the 8,500 seat on-campus Bain–Schaeffer Buffalo Stadium. The team formerly played at the 20,000 seat Kimbrough Memorial Stadium. They are coached by Josh Lynn.

Notable former players

Notable alumni include:

 Ralph Anderson
 Anthony Armstrong
 Grady Benton
 Carl Birdsong
 Tully Blanchard
 Cloyce Box
 Bryan Braman
 Stephen Burton
 Eric Collins
 Ted DiBiase
 Bobby Duncum Sr.
 Dory Funk Jr.
 Terry Funk
 Frank Goodish, better known as Bruiser Brody
 Stan Hansen
 Kareem Larrimore
 Chaun Thompson
 Jerry Logan
 Ron Mayo
 Reggie McElroy
 Mercury Morris
 Jesse Powell
 Bo Robinson
 Khiry Robinson
 Virgil Runnels, better known as Dusty Rhodes
 Eugene Sims
 Merced Solis, better known as Tito Santana
 Duane Thomas
 Rocky Thompson
 J'Marcus Webb
 Ethan Westbrooks

Conference championships

Classification history
1910–1955 – NCAA
1956–1972 – NCAA University Division (Major College)
1973–1977 – NCAA Division I
1978–1981 – NCAA Division I-A
1982–1985 – NCAA Division I-AA
1986–1990 – NCAA Division II
1991 – No team
1992–present – NCAA Division II

Conference history
1910–1924 – Independent
1925–1930 – Texas Intercollegiate Athletic Association
1931–1938 – Independent
1939–1940 – Alamo Conference
1941–1961 – Border Conference
1962–1971 – Independent
1972–1985 – Missouri Valley Conference
1986–1990 – Lone Star Conference
1992–1994 – Division II Independent
1995–present – Lone Star Conference

Postseason

Bowl appearances
West Texas A&M participated in four bowl games, all while during known as West Texas State. They went 4–0.

They have also competed in the Kanza Bowl, a Division II bowl between the Lone Star Conference and the Mid-America Intercollegiate Athletics Association from 2009–2012, going 2–0.

NCAA Division II playoffs

Head coaches
Don Carthel has the most all-time wins for the Buffaloes, who have gone 521–516–23 as of 2019.

References

External links
 

 
American football teams established in 1910
1910 establishments in Texas